Bian Tongda (born 1 April 1991) is a Chinese racewalking athlete. In 2021, he represented China at the 2020 Summer Olympics in Tokyo, placing 7th in the men's 50 kilometres walk.

References

 

1991 births
Living people
Chinese male racewalkers
Athletes (track and field) at the 2020 Summer Olympics
Olympic athletes of China